Anton Eugene Armstrong (born April 26, 1956) is the conductor of the St. Olaf Choir as well as the Harry R. and Thora H. Tosdal Professor of Music at St. Olaf College of Northfield, Minnesota in the United States. Armstrong became the fourth director of the St. Olaf Choir in 1990, continuing the tradition begun by the choir's founder F. Melius Christiansen in 1911, sustained and developed by his son, Olaf Christiansen, and strengthened and enhanced by Kenneth Jennings. Armstrong teaches conducting in the Sacred Music department at Luther Seminary and also conducts some pieces in "Northfield Youth Choirs".

Early life
Anton was born in New York City on April 26, 1956 to William Benfield Armstrong (1916–2002) and Esther Louise Holder (1917–2007). William was born in Antigua, and Esther was born in New York City to Herbert Henry Holder (1887–1973) and Leander Hassell (1890–1945), both from St Thomas. Armstrong grew up on Long Island where he and his mother were active singers in a local church choir. Armstrong joined the American Boychoir, based in Princeton, New Jersey. According to Armstrong, "That experience lit my fire for choral singing."

Armstrong earned his bachelor's degree at St. Olaf College, graduating in 1978. He was a member of the St. Olaf Choir from 1976–1978, under the leadership of Kenneth Jennings. Jennings became a mentor to Armstrong and 12 years after graduating from St. Olaf, Armstrong replaced Jennings as director of the St. Olaf Choir.

Career
Armstrong was invited to conduct the Masterwork Festival Chorus's performance of Robert Ray's Gospel Mass at Carnegie Hall on March 18, 2019.  He was also the conductor of several All-State Honor Choirs across more than 40 states, most recently being the 2022 Kansas Music Educators Association All-State Mixed Choir. 

Armstrong served two terms as president of the Choristers Guild and has led numerous webinars and given lectures for Choristers Guild over the past decades.

References

St. Olaf Choir the conductor. 2005. Updated n.d. December 10, 2005.
 Youth Choral Academy Oregon Bach Festival. 2001. Updated n.d. December 10, 2005.
 American Public Media. 2005. The legacy of the Saint Olaf Choir. Updated n.d. December 10, 2005.
 Ashmore, Nancy J. 2004. Spirit voices. St. Olaf Magazine, September, 29.
 Tpt. 2005. A St. Olaf Christmas in Norway. Updated n.d. December 10, 2005.

External links
Oregon Bach Festival Youth Choral Academy Official Website
St. Olaf College
St. Olaf Choir
Biography page

Michigan State University alumni
1956 births
Living people
American choral conductors
American male conductors (music)
St. Olaf College alumni
St. Olaf College faculty
Classical musicians from New York (state)
21st-century American conductors (music)
21st-century American male musicians